The Minister of Finance of Tuvalu heads the Ministry of Finance of Tuvalu.

Ministers of Finance
Toalipi Lauti, 1977–1981 
Henry Naisali, 1981–1986
Kitiseni Lopati, 1987–1989 
Alesana Seluka, 1989–1993
Koloa Talake, 1994–1996
Alesana Seluka, 1996–1999
Lagitupu Tuilimu, 1999–2001
Saufatu Sopoanga, 2001–2002
Bikenibeu Paeniu, 2002–2006
Lotoala Metia, 2006–2010
Monise Laafai, 2010
Lotoala Metia, 2010–2012
Maatia Toafa, 2013–2019
Seve Paeniu, 2019–

See also
Economy of Tuvalu
National Bank of Tuvalu

References

External links
Ministry of Finance

Government of Tuvalu
Government ministers of Tuvalu
 
Economy of Tuvalu